Iwabuchi (written: 岩渕 or 岩淵) is a Japanese surname. Notable people with the surname include:

, Japanese tennis player
, Japanese rugby union player and coach
, Japanese women's footballer
, Japanese snowboarder
, Japanese footballer
, Imperial Japanese Navy admiral
, Japanese tennis player
, Japanese softball player

Japanese-language surnames